The 2012 ARFU Development Cup was the third edition of the Division II Championship, it was an official tournament for "developing" teams and was held in Manila, Philippines. After a tense match against Thailand that ended 21–19, Singapore was declared the winner.

Standings

Bracket

Results

Semi-finals

Third place

Final

References 

2006 in Asian rugby union
2006 in women's rugby union
Asia Rugby Women's Championship
Rugby union in China
Rugby union in Hong Kong
Rugby union in Singapore
Rugby union in Thailand
Asia Rugby